Alexandre Bécognée (born 3 September 1996) is a French rugby union player who plays for  in the Top 14. His playing position is flanker. He made his debut for France in the 2021 July rugby union tests against Australia.

Reference list

External links
itsrugby.co.uk profile

1996 births
French rugby union players
France international rugby union players
Living people
Rugby union flankers
Stade Montois players
Montpellier Hérault Rugby players